Geulimja (그림자; Shadow) is a 1935 Korean film directed by Na Woon-gyu. It premiered at the Woo Mi Kwan theater.

Plot 
The story is a melodrama concerning a young woman, played by Yun Bong-choon, who is abused by her stepmother and half-sister. After her stepmother expels her from her home, she stabs her stepmother.

References

External links

See also
 Korea under Japanese rule
 List of Korean-language films
 Cinema of Korea

1935 films
Pre-1948 Korean films
Korean black-and-white films
Films directed by Na Woon-gyu
1935 drama films
Melodrama films